Camillo Sozzini (born c. 1520) was an Italian humanist and "heretic". He was the brother of Alessandro Sozzini, Lelio Sozzini, Cornelio Sozzini, and Dario Sozzini.

References

1520 births
Year of death missing
Camillo